Joseph Anton Echteler (5 January 1853, in Legau – 23 December 1908, in Mainz) was a German sculptor.

Biography 
Echteler was the son of the economist and baker Leonhard Echteler und Marianna von Sandholz. After tending to sheep and cattle up to age twelve, he learned the craft of stone masonry, carving, stuccowork and sculpting at a chiseler in Leutkirch im Allgäu. On his journeyman years he came to Stuttgart, where he visited the fine arts school. From November 1872 he continued his artistic education at the Academy of Fine Arts in Munich under Max von Widnmann and Joseph Knabl.

In Munich he first became known as a portrait artist who created medallions, reliefs and busts of famous stage artists, singers, artists, scholars, councillors, church dignitaries, diplomats, and royalty, after photographs. His work impressed by their great lifelikeness and careful execution. Soon he also executed tomb sculptures, religious and mythological sculptures, animals and group works.

In May 1884 Echteler left his Munich studio and moved together with his family to the U.S. where he worked primarily as a portrait artist. After President Grant died in 1885, it was decided to erect a monument and mausoleum to his memory in New York City. Echteler worked out and submitted a design, which was among the finalists in February 1887. He did not win the contest for the memorial however. In Autumn 1887 he returned to Munich. He created busts and badges of Europe's highest royalty and received numerous honors and awards. His total work comprises about 200 busts, among these Emperor Wilhelm, Franz Joseph, Alexander II and the kings of Bavaria and Württemberg.

Echteler was awarded the honorary title professor by Heinrich XXII, Prince Reuss of Greiz for his artistic work. As the Kingdom of Bavaria would not at first permit him to use the title because of its origin, the artist's complaints nearly led to a diplomatic crisis between Bavaria and the Principality of Reuss-Greiz in 1899. The matter was resolved by Echteler changing his citizenship to that of the Principality, which made it legally possible for him to use the title professor.

Among Echteler's best known students is Emil von Schlitz.

Marriages and children 
Echteler, a Catholic was married three times. His first wife Dorathea, a Catholic (née Seybold born in Munich 28 November 1858) bore him three girls. Their fourth child, a long-awaited boy, was born dead late 1889 in Munich. Joseph's grief consumed him, losing his only born son. Joseph on 2 February 1890, sent Dora and their daughters Marie (born in Munich September 1878), Olga (born in Hoboken, New Jersey, USA August 1886) and Eda (born in Munich, July 1888) to America, with their understanding Joseph's design won the honor of him sculpting Grant's Tomb in NYC. Joseph never joined them, but sent his family under a pretext, then annulled his first Catholic marriage and married a divorced Protestant. His second wife was Elisabeth Fuchs (née Geret); they married 24 April 1890 and divorced 27 September 1904. Echteler married Anna Kramer a Protestant (née Nikolai, a widow) 18 November 1905.

Works (selection) 

 Mater dolorosa
 Ecce homo
 Madonna
 Group after Walther von der Vogelweide
 Waisenschutz (group)
 Knabe mit Hund und Taube
 Pirithous' Kampf um Helena (colossal group in marble/bronze)
 Der Kampf um seinen Liebling
 Venus sich mit Rosen schmückend
 Herkules im Kampf mit dem Nemëischen Löwen
 Amazonenkämpfe zu Pferd
 Fürst von Sayn-Wittgenstein (portrait bust commissioned by the Tsar of Russia)
 1875 Johann Nepomuk von Nußbaum (portrait bust)
 1881 Venus mit dem gezähmten Löwen
 1881 Herakles nimmt der Amazonenkönigin Hipolyte das Wehrgehänge ab
 1881 Antiope und Theseus
 1883 Ignaz von Döllinger (portrait bust)
 1883–84 Charles Darwin (portrait bust, Metropolitan Museum of Art)
 1884 Mrs. Frank Leslie (portrait bust)
 1888 Konrad Maurer (portrait bust, National and University Library of Iceland)

Literature 
 Hermann Alexander Müller: Biographisches Künstler-Lexikon, pages 108f. Leipzig 1908
 Ulrich Thieme, Felix Becker et al.: Allgemeines Lexikon der Bildenden Künstler von der Antike bis zur Gegenwart, page 313. Leipzig 1914
 Brockhaus' Kleines Konversations-Lexikon, fifth edition of 1911
 Brockhaus' Konversations-Lexikon, volume 17, page 350
 Echteler's register entry at the Munich Academy of Fine Arts
 Dr. Hermann Alex. Müller, Biographisches Künstler-Lexikon, page 153, Verlag des Bibliographischen Instituts, Leipzig, 1882
 B. Volger: Deutschlands, Österreich-Ungarns und der Schweiz Gelehrte, Künstler und Schriftsteller in Wort und Bild, 1908, page 103
 Herrmann A. L. Degener: Wer ist's?'', 1905, page 298. Volume 4 of 1908, page 308

References

External links 

 Bust of Charles Darwin in the Metropolitan Museum of Art

1853 births
1908 deaths
19th-century German sculptors
German male sculptors
20th-century German sculptors
20th-century German male artists